The Ministry of Heavy Industries is an executive agency of the Government of India. The Ministry  entails for promoting the engineering industry viz. machine tools, heavy electrical, industrial machinery, and auto industry and administration of 29 operating CPSEs and 4 autonomous organizations.

As of July 2021, the Honourable Minister is Mahendra Nath Pandey, and the Honourable Minister of State is Krishan Pal Gurjar.

History
The Ministry of Heavy Industries is previously Ministry of Heavy Industries and Public Enterprise. On 7 July 2021 the Ministry has been renamed as Ministry of Heavy Industries. The Department of Public Enterprises has become a part of Ministry of Finance.

Structure

Autonomous Bodies
There are four autonomous bodies under the ownership of Ministry of Heavy Industries.

1. Fluid Control Research Institute (FCRI)

2. The Automotive Research Association of India (ARAI),ARAI Forging Industry Division (ARAI-FID)

3. International Centre for Automotive Technology (ICAT),Haryana

4.Central Manufacturing Technology Institute (CMTI)

Central Public Sector Undertakings
There are 22 CPSUs under the ownership of Ministry of Heavy Industries 

1. Andrew Yule and Company (AYCL)

2.Bharat Heavy Electricals Ltd. (BHEL)

3.BHEL Electrical Machines Ltd (BHEL-EML)

4.Bharat Pumps and compressors Ltd. (BPCL)

5.Heavy Engineering Corporation Ltd. (HEC)

6.HMT Ltd.(Holding Company with Tractor Division)

7.HMT (Bearings ) Limited (a subsidiary of HMT)

8.HMT Machine Tools (a subsidiary of HMT)

9.Instrumentation Ltd. Kota (IL)

10.Rajasthan Electronics & Instruments Ltd.(subsidiary of ILK)

11.Richardson & Cruddass (1972) Ltd.(R & C)

12.Scooters India Ltd.(SIL)

13.Tungabhadra Steel Products Ltd.(TSPL)

14.Cement Corporation of India Ltd.(CCI)

15.Hindustan Salts Ltd. (HSL)

16.Sambhar Salts Ltd. (SSL) (Subsidiary of HSL)

17.Nepa Limited (NEPA)

18.Nagaland Pulp and Paper company Ltd. (NPPCL)

19. Bridge & Roof Company (India) Ltd.

20. Engineering Projects (India) Ltd.(EPI)

21. Hooghly Printing company Limited (a subsidiary of AYCL)

22. Braithwaite Burn and Jessop (BBJ) constr

Industrial Sectors Regulation 
The Industrial sectors regulated by the Ministry of Heavy Industries are:

(a) Heavy Engineering Equipment and Machine Tools Industry

(b) Heavy Electrical Engineering Industry

(c) Automotive Sector, including Tractors and Earth Moving Equipment

 20 Sub-sectors under the 3 broad sectors are as under:

(i) Boilers

(ii) Cement Machinery

(iii) Dairy Machinery

(iv) Electrical Furnace

(v) Diesel Engines

(vi) Material Handling Equipment

(vii) Metallurgical Machinery including Steel Plant Equipment

(viii) Earthmoving and Mining Machinery

(ix) Machine Tool

(x) Oil Field Equipment

(xi) Printing Machinery  

(xii) Pulp and Paper Machinery

(xiii) Rubber Machinery

(xiv) Switchgear and Control Gear

(xv) Plastic Processing Machinery

(xvi) Sugar Machinery

(xvii) Turbines & Generator Set

(xviii) Transformers

(xix) Textile Machinery

(xx) Food Processing Machinery

List Of Ministers

Ministers of State

References

External links
Ministry website

Heavy Industries
India
Industry in India
Heavy industry